Make Architects is an international architecture practice headquartered in London that also has offices in offices in Hong Kong and Sydney. Founded in 2004 by former Foster + Partners architect Ken Shuttleworth. The practice has a variety of projects including high-rise office buildings, large mixed-use schemes, urban masterplanning, sports and leisure, private and social housing, civic and education buildings, and interior design. The company is employee-owned and has about 150 partners, which it refers to as "makers".

Selected projects
Arts & Culture 
 City of London Information Centre
 The Podium
 Weihai Pavilion
 Beijing InfoCube
Education & Research
 Jubilee Campus extension, University of Nottingham
 The Barn, University of Nottingham
 The Gateway Building, University of Nottingham
 Big Data Institute, University of Oxford
 The Kennedy Institute of Rheumatology, University of Oxford
 The Nuffield Department of Medicine, University of Oxford
Old Road Campus Research Building, University of Oxford
Oxford Molecular Pathology Institute, University of Oxford
The Thomas Clarkson Community College, Cambridgeshire
Hotels and resorts
 Mi Xun Spa
 The Montpellier Chapter
 The Oasis at Golden Sands
 Serensia Woods
 The Temple House
 Wanda Reign Wuhan
Mixed use
 80 Charlotte Street
 The Cube, Birmingham
 LSQ London
 Morello
 Rathbone Square
 St James's Market
 Wynyard Place
Office 
 1 Arena Central
 Two Arena Central
 3 Arena Central
 55 Baker Street, London
 5 Broadgate, City of London
32 Cleveland Street
The Hiscox Building
HSBC Blandonnet
London Wall Place
The Monument Building
Quai des Bergues
Residential
10 Weymouth Street
4–16 Artillery Row
12–24 Lun Fat Street
Dunbar Place
Chobham Manor
Century House
Crescent House
Grosvenor Waterside
Morello Croydon
The Madison
Rodmarton Street
Sports and leisure
The Copper Box (London 2012 Olympic Handball Arena)
The Dartford Dojo
Greenwich Centre
Urban design
 Chobham Manor
Elephant and Castle
Greenwich Square
Wembley North West Lands

Awards and recognitions
In 2016 the practice won the Architects' Journal AJ100 Employer of the Year Award and in 2014 won the AJ100 Practice of the Year Award.

The company's work has been nominated three times for Building Design magazine's Carbuncle Cup, an annual award for "the ugliest building in the United Kingdom". Nottingham University Jubilee Campus was runner-up in 2009, The Cube in Birmingham was nominated in 2010, and the redevelopment of 5 Broadgate was nominated in 2016.

References

External links
Make Architects website
Interview with Ken Shuttleworth 2008(Video)
Make Projects

Architecture firms based in London
Design companies established in 2004
British companies established in 2004